The Family Firm Institute (FFI) is an American professional membership association for individuals and organizations working in the family enterprise field. It owns the academic journal Family Business Review published by SAGE, the digital journal FFI Practitioner, and the Global Educational Network (GEN) which provides certificates in family business and family wealth advising.

FFI was founded in 1986. Its home office is in Boston, Massachusetts.  It is led and governed by a board consisting of a chair, president, vice chair, secretary, treasurer and additional board members.

External links
 Family Business Review, Sage Publications
 FFI Practitioner
 FFI Global Education Network

Organizations established in 1986
Organizations based in Boston
1986 establishments in Massachusetts